California Fever may refer to:

California Fever (TV series), an American teen drama series that ran on CBS
Coccidioidomycosis, a fungal disease caused by Coccidioides immitis or Coccidioides posadasii